The Wonderboom (Afrikaans: 'wonder tree') is a dense grove of parent and daughter trees of the species Ficus salicifolia, that descended from a central bole of about a thousand years old. It is situated in the Wonderboom Nature Reserve, Pretoria, and two circular walkways currently protect it from pedestrian traffic around its trunk and roots. As it has grown, its outlying branches have rooted themselves around the parent tree. This has repeated until there are now three layers of daughter trees encircling the mother fig, with 13 distinct trunks, covering an area with a diameter of over 50 metres.

History
The tree was discovered by the Voortrekkers in 1836 under the leadership of Hendrik Potgieter who named it the Wonderboom. Many Trekkers rested under its shade on their journey to the Soutpansberg.

In 1870 a fire destroyed a large part of the tree reducing its size drastically.

The Wonderboom Nature Reserve was declared a national monument on 23 September 1988.

See also
 List of Champion Trees (South Africa)
 List of individual trees

References

Monuments and memorials in South Africa
Individual trees in South Africa
History of Pretoria
Individual fig trees